Die Nacht ("The night") is a 1985 West German installation film directed by Hans-Jürgen Syberberg. It consists of a six hours long monologue performed by Edith Clever, who reads texts by Syberberg and many different authors, such as Johann Wolfgang von Goethe, Heinrich von Kleist, Plato, Friedrich Hölderlin, Novalis, Friedrich Nietzsche, Eduard Mörike, Richard Wagner, William Shakespeare, Martin Heidegger, Samuel Beckett and chief Seattle. The film was screened out of competition at the 1985 Cannes Film Festival.

Die Nacht has primarily been shown as an exhibition at art galleries, where viewers have been welcome to come and go as they please. Syberberg has said: "The gesamtkunstwerk I formerly strove for, now [with Edith Clever] became a theater of the world within one person ... where film and theater came together for me. The film on the stage, and the theater in the film." The film won the Deutscher Filmpreis for Best Direction and Best Actress.

References

External links 
 

1985 films
1980s avant-garde and experimental films
German avant-garde and experimental films
West German films
1980s German-language films
Adaptations of works by Friedrich Nietzsche
Films based on works by Heinrich von Kleist
Films based on works by Johann Wolfgang von Goethe
Films based on works by Richard Wagner
Films based on works by William Shakespeare
Films directed by Hans-Jürgen Syberberg
1980s German films